Cambridge is a city in Isanti County, Minnesota, United States, located at the junction of Minnesota State Highways 65 and 95. The population was 9,611 at the 2020 census.  It is the county seat of Isanti County. It is located along the Rum River and BNSF's Hinckley Subdivision. Cambridge is notable for having the highest percentage of Swedish Americans of any city in the United States with a population of over 5,000 people.

History
The city of Cambridge was established in the late 19th century along the railroad from Minneapolis to Duluth. It was named by, and originally settled by, immigrants from New England.  These were "Yankee" settlers, that is to say they were descended from the English Puritans who settled New England during the colonial era.  The same population founded and named the town of Princeton nearby.  Later on the surrounding area would be heavily populated with Swedish, and German, immigrants.

The city of Cambridge was incorporated in 1877.

In the early 20th century, Cambridge had a potato starch factory, a 1,301-barrel flour mill, a wool carding and spinning mill, an electric lighting plant, and local and long-distance telephone systems.

The Cambridge station served passenger trains until 1985.

Geography

The Rum River flows north to south through the middle of Cambridge. Camping, canoeing, and fishing are popular attractions of the Rum River.

Major highways
The following routes are located within the city of Cambridge.

  Minnesota State Highway 65
  Minnesota State Highway 95

Climate
Cambridge has a warm-summer humid continental climate, with the average July temperature being just below the isotherm for the hot-summer subtype. Temperature differences between summer and winters are large, typical of the Upper Midwest. Spring and fall are rather short due to the extreme warming and cooling off depending on daylight hours. Winter is relatively long and cold, but cools off later and heats up earlier than more northerly areas of the state. The warm to hot summers are also typical of central Minnesota and tend to bring more precitipation than during winter.

Demographics

2010 census
As of the census of 2010, there were 8,111 people, 3,137 households, and 1,967 families living in the city. The racial makeup of the city was 94.5% White, 1.0% African American, 0.5% Native American, 1.4% Asian, 0.5% from other races, and 2.1% from two or more races. Hispanic or Latino of any race were 1.7% of the population.

There were 3,137 households, of which 35.1% had children under the age of 18 living with them, 45.3% were married couples living together, 12.5% had a female householder with no husband present, 4.9% had a male householder with no wife present, and 37.3% were non-families. 31.6% of all households were made up of individuals, and 15.5% had someone living alone who was 65 years of age or older. The average household size was 2.47 and the average family size was 3.08.

The median age in the city was 34.1 years. 26.6% of residents were under the age of 18; 8.9% were between the ages of 18 and 24; 27.5% were from 25 to 44; 19.5% were from 45 to 64; and 17.5% were 65 years of age or older. The gender makeup of the city was 47.4% male and 52.6% female.

2000 census
As of the census of 2000, there were 5,520 people, 2,237 households, and 1,353 families living in the city. The racial makeup of the city was 97.21% White, 0.31% African American, 0.67% Native American, 0.58% Asian, 0.02% Pacific Islander, 0.25% from other races, and 0.96% from two or more races. Hispanic or Latino of any race were 0.63% of the population. 24.7% were of Swedish, 24.6% German, 14.6% Norwegian and 5.1% Irish ancestry.

There were 2,237 households, out of which 32.1% had children under the age of 18 living with them, 44.5% were married couples living together, 12.8% had a female householder with no husband present, and 39.5% were non-families. 35.1% of all households were made up of individuals, and 19.5% had someone living alone who was 65 years of age or older.  The average household size was 2.29 and the average family size was 2.95.

In the city, the population was spread out, with 24.9% under the age of 18, 8.7% from 18 to 24, 25.6% from 25 to 44, 17.8% from 45 to 64, and 23.1% who were 65 years of age or older.  The median age was 38 years. For every 100 females, there were 82.2 males.  For every 100 females age 18 and over, there were 76.9 males.

The median income for a household in the city was $35,313, and the median income for a family was $53,381. Males had a median income of $34,836 versus $23,681 for females. The per capita income for the city was $20,697.  About 5.8% of families and 10.5% of the population were below the poverty line, including 8.6% of those under age 18 and 12.0% of those age 65 or over.

Economy
Cambridge is a local commercial center. It contains several traditional big-box retail stores, including Target, Wal-Mart, Kohl's, Mills FleetFarm and Menard's. The recently expanded Cambridge Medical Center serves as the regional health care center.

Education
Cambridge-Isanti High School, Cambridge Middle School, Cambridge Intermediate School, and Cambridge Primary School serve the community.  Two new schools, Cambridge Middle School and Isanti Intermediate School, were built in the fall of 2006 to house the expanding school population.

Cambridge Christian School, founded in 1978, has new facilities in the city of Cambridge.

Cambridge is also home to the Cambridge campus of Anoka-Ramsey Community College.

Notable people
 Lynn H. Becklin - politician
 Robert C. Becklin - politician and businessman
 Mickey Erickson - professional football player for Chicago Cardinals and Boston Braves
 Godfrey G. Goodwin - former member of the U.S. House of Representatives
 Todd Hallowell - film producer
 Julia Hart - professional wrestler
 Kerri Hoskins - former glamour model and video game actress
 Brian Johnson - politician
 Rhonda Sivarajah - politician
 Corie Barry - CEO of Best Buy

References

External links

 City website
 Independent School District #911 - Link
 Cambridge Swedish Festival

 
Cities in Minnesota
Cities in Isanti County, Minnesota
County seats in Minnesota